Manning is a town in the Austrian state of Upper Austria.

Population

References

External links
Information about Manning from Flags of the World

Cities and towns in Vöcklabruck District